Melaleuca papillosa is a plant in the myrtle family, Myrtaceae and is endemic to the south-west of Western Australia. It is one of the smallest species of Melaleuca, distinguished by its narrow, usually hairy, pimply leaves, small heads of pink to purple flowers surrounded by silky hairs and scattered rather than clustered fruits.

Description
The leaves are more or less curved, usually covered with short, matted, silky hairs and have small, pimply projections.

The flowers are a shade of pink to purple and arranged in heads on the ends of branches which continue to grow after flowering and sometimes also in the upper leaf axils. The outer surface of the floral cup (the hypanthium) is usually hairy and there are five bundles of stamens around the flower, each with 4 to 7 stamens.

Taxonomy and naming
Melaleuca papillosa was first formally described in 1999 by Lyndley Craven in Australian Systematic Botany from a specimen collected in the Fitzgerald River National Park. The specific epithet (papillosa) is derived from the Latin word papilla meaning "nipple" referring to the pimply surface of the leaves.

Distribution and habitat
Melaleuca papillosa occurs in the Fitzgerald River district in the Esperance Plains biogeographic region. It grows in mallee heath in rocky clay loam.

Conservation
Melaleuca papillosa is listed as "not threatened" by the Government of Western Australia Department of Parks and Wildlife.

References

External links
 
 

papillosa
Plants described in 1999
Endemic flora of Western Australia
Taxa named by Lyndley Craven